Olsberg is a town in the Hochsauerland district, in North Rhine-Westphalia, Germany.

Geography
It is situated on the river Ruhr, approx. 15 km east of Meschede. It is bordered by Arnsberg Forest Nature Park, on the northern fringe of the Rothaargebirge. The town's setting is dominated by heavily wooded ridges and valleys formed by the Ruhr and three of its tributaries.

A notable feature situated within the town's limits are the Bruchhauser Steine, four large porphyry rocks located on a mountain near the village of Bruchhausen.

The Langenberg, the highest mountain of north-west Germany and North Rhine-Westphalia, is located on the eastern town border, the peak being just inside the town's limits.

Neighbouring towns and municipalities
Clockwise from the north, Olsberg is bordered by:
 Brilon
 Willingen
 Winterberg
 Schmallenberg
 Bestwig

Division of the town
The town of Olsberg comprises twelve villages. The town's core consists of Olsberg itself and Bigge, which have physically merged since the 1950s.

Antfeld
Assinghausen
Bigge
Olsberg
Bruchhausen
Brunskappel
Elleringhausen
Elpe/Heinrichsdorf
Gevelinghausen
Helmeringhausen
Wiemeringhausen
Wulmeringhausen

History

The town was formed on January 1, 1975 in the course of the municipal reorganization of North Rhine-Westphalia. Before that date all villages (except Bigge and Olsberg, which had been merged already been merged into a single municipality in 1969) have been independent municipalities.

Politics
The town council is currently headed by mayor Wolfgang Fischer (CDU), re-elected in 2020. The composition of the town council is, since 2020:

Economy
Traditionally dominated by agriculture (especially dairy farming) and small scale wood and metal craft, the town's economical base today relies on the tertiary sector, especially tourism. Industry consists primarily of metallurgy and sawmills.

Transport

Rail
The town has two train stations. 
 Olsberg railway station is situated on the railway line between Hagen and Kassel and receives a generally hourly service in both direction.
 Bigge railway station is on the line between Dortmund and Winterberg and has a one train in each direction every two hours.

Bus
Buses connect the town core to the neighbouring villages and towns, generally with hourly services. Most bus services meet at Olsberg railway station to connect with train services.

Road
The Bundesstraße 480 runs through the town from north to south, and meets the Bundesstraße 7 just north of the town in the village of Altenbüren. The current end of the A46 motorway is 5 km to the Northwest.

Town bypass
Construction on a southern bypass road started in 2005 and is scheduled for opening in 2010. It will take the Bundesstrasse 480 to a new route bypassing the town core to the west and the south.

Education
Children are allocated to four primary schools according to their place of residence. Additionally there are three secondary schools, one of which caters for children with physical disabilities. While the town does not have a Gymnasium (higher education school), it maintains a vocational college.

International relations

Olsberg is twinned with:
  Olsberg, Canton of Aargau (Switzerland) -- since 1974
  Fruges (France) -- since 1965
  Jöhstadt (Germany) -- since 1990

See also

 2014 Olsberg mid-air collision

References

External links 

 Official site 

Hochsauerlandkreis